Kim Woo-Yong (Hangul: 김우용; born 1971 in Pyeongchang, Gangwon-do) is a retired South Korean freestyle wrestler.

Kim won the gold medal in the men's freestyle 54 kg class at the 1999 World Championships held in Ankara, Turkey. However, his later career was hampered by a shoulder fracture he had during the 2000 Olympic trials, forcing him into retirement in 2001.

Kim participated in the 2006 Asian Games as an assistant coach of the South Korean women's national wrestling team, and currently serves as the coach of the Pyeongchang County Government Wrestling Team.

References

1971 births
Living people
South Korean wrestlers
South Korean male sport wrestlers
World Wrestling Championships medalists
Sportspeople from Gangwon Province, South Korea
20th-century South Korean people